The Military Council of Georgia (Georgian: საქართველოს რესპუბლიკის სამხედრო საბჭო) was a national security body of the Government of Georgia which was established on January 2, 1992 during the military coup in Georgia. It was an unconstitutional body that served as the leadership of the country to just over 2 months. The council announced the overthrow of President Zviad Gamsakhurdia and served as the collective head of state from January 6, 1992 until March 10 of that year, when the military council was replaced by the State Council led by Eduard Shevardnadze. The full composition of the Military Council was never published, with all orders and resolutions being signed by Tengiz Kitovani and Jaba Ioseliani on behalf of the Council.

References

1992 establishments in Georgia (country)
Georgia
Government agencies of Georgia (country)
Military history of Georgia (country)